Suryadi Gunawan (born 25 May 1966) is an Indonesian wrestler. He competed in the men's freestyle 48 kg at the 1988 Summer Olympics.

References

1966 births
Living people
Indonesian male sport wrestlers
Olympic wrestlers of Indonesia
Wrestlers at the 1988 Summer Olympics
Place of birth missing (living people)
20th-century Indonesian people